Marquess of Oris is a hereditary title in the Peerage of Spain granted on 1 August 1708 by Charles VI, pretender to the Spanish Crown in favor of Carlos de Orís y Puiggener. The name makes reference to Oris Castle in the county of Osona, Province de Barcelona, of which the 1st Marquess was the lord of, as a descendant of the second branch of the Orís line.

It was re-created in 1915 by Alfonso XIII in favor of Carlos de Sentmenat y de Sentmenat, who also held the titles of Marquess of Castelldosrius (which had attached to it a Grandeeship) and Baron of Santa Pau.

Marquesses of Oris 

 Carlos de Orís y Puiggener, 1st Marquess of Oris
Other titles (2nd–4th Marquesses): Marquess of Castelldosrius, Grandee of Spain and Baron of Santa Pau
 Carlos de Sentmenat y de Sentmenat, 2nd Marquess of Oris (grandson of the 1st Marquess)
 Félix de Sentmenat y Güell, 3rd Marquess of Oris (son of the 2nd Marquess)
 Santiago de Sentmenat y de Urruela, 4th Marquess of Oris (son of the 3rd Marquess)
 Ana Isabel Sentmenat Vilá, 5th Marchioness of Oris (eldest daughter of the 4th Marquess)

References 

1708 in Spain
Marquessates in the Spanish nobility